A boilermaker is a trained craftsman who produces steel fabrications from plates and sections.

Boilermaker may also refer to:
 Boilermaker (beer cocktail)
 Purdue Boilermakers, Purdue University's intercollegiate athletics teams
 The Boilermaker, a statue
 Boilermaker Road Race, a race in Utica, New York
 "Boilermaker", a song by The Jesus Lizard from Liar
 “Boilermaker”, a song by Royal Blood from Typhoons
 Boilermaker, a member of the International Brotherhood of Boilermakers